Stretton is a civil parish in the district of East Staffordshire, Staffordshire, England.  It contains five buildings that are recorded in the National Heritage List for England.  Of these, one is listed at Grade II*, the middle grade, and the others are at Grade II, the lowest grade.  The parish is to the north of, and continuous with, the town of Burton upon Trent, and is largely residential.  The listed buildings consist of a church, a house, a farmhouse, and two mileposts, one on a canal, and the other on a road.


Key

Buildings

References

Citations

Sources

Stretton